Bernice L. McFadden (born September 26, 1965) is an American novelist. She has also written humorous erotica under the pseudonym Geneva Holliday. Author of fifteen novels, she is an Assistant Professor of Creative Writing at Tulane University in New Orleans.

Life 
Bernice L. McFadden was born and raised in Brooklyn, New York.

In April 2005 McFadden was a MacDowell Colony Fellow in New Hampshire. She received an El Gouna Writers’ Residency in Egypt in June 2011. In April 2013 she was Serenbe Artist-in-Residence in Georgia.

In 2016 McFadden was awarded an MFA from The Writer's Foundry at St. Joseph's College in Brooklyn, NY.

Works 

Sugar: A Novel. Dutton Publishers. 2000,  (UK: Random House UK, Vintage. ISBN 9781784877316
 The Warmest December. Dutton Publishers. 2001, 
This Bitter Earth. Dutton Publishers. 2002, 
Loving Donovan. Dutton Publishers. 2003, 
Camilla's Roses. Dutton Publishers. 2004, 
Nowhere is a Place. Dutton Publishers. 2006, 
Glorious. Brooklyn, NY: Akashic Books, 2010, 
Gathering of Waters. New York: Akashic Books, 2012  
 Praise Song for the Butterflies, Brooklyn, New York: Akashic Books, 2018. ,  (UK: Jacaranda Books)
The Book of Harlan. Brooklyn, New York: Akashic Books, 2016 ,  (UK: Jacaranda Books)

Writing as Geneva Holliday: 
 Groove. Random House. 2005
 Fever. Random House. 2006 
 Heat. Random House. 2007
 Seduction. Random House. 2008
 Lover Man. Random House. 2009

Short fiction

 "Keeper of Keys", USA Today Open Book Series. July 2001 (USA)
 "Luscious", Gumbo: A Literary Rent Party. Marita Golden, ed. Doubleday, 2002 (USA)
 "One Night Stand", Black Silk. Retha Powers, ed. Warner Books, 2002 (USA)
 "Sit", Brown Sugar II. Carol Taylor, ed. Washington Square Press, 2003 (USA)
 "Black Power", On The Line. Donna Hill, ed. Sepia Books, 2008 (USA)
 "Coming to America", Time Out New York. October 2014 (USA)
"OBF Inc.", Cutting Edge: New Stories of Mystery and Crime by Women Writers. Joyce Carol Oates]], ed. Akashic Books, 2019 (USA)
"God's Work," Nicotine Chronicles. Lee Childs, ed. Akashic Books, 2020 (USA)
 "Tisoy.," Audible Originals, 2021 (USA)

Creative Non-fiction

"Forward, Prologue & Preface". Black Boy. Richard Wright, Everbind Anthologies, 2003 (USA)
"Superman Has His Cape." The Washington Post, March 19, 2006
"The Power of Prayer." Black Pain. Terrie Williams, ed. Scribner, 2008 (USA)
"Black Writers in a Ghetto of the Publishing Industry's Making," The Washington Post. June 26, 2010
Review of If Sons, Then Heirs by Lorene Cary. The Philadelphia Inquirer. May 22, 2011
"Life in Egypt." Crisis Magazine. December 2011
 Review of The Last Runaway by Tracy Chevalier. The Washington Post. January 10, 2013
 "Barbados", The New York Times (Travel Section). November 10, 2013
"Bernice L. McFadden Introduces her New Novel, The Book of Harlan", October 10, 2016, www.foyles.co.uk. Retrieved November 15, 2020
"15." What My Mother and I Don't Talk About. Michele Filgate, ed. Simon and Schuster (2019)
"What Didn't Kill Her."  Longreads  June 4, 2020 (USA)
"Zora Neale Hurston." Four Hundred Souls.  Ibram X. Kendi, ed., Keisha N. Blain, ed. One World, 2021 (USA)
"My Seat at the Table."  Longreads, August 5, 2021(USA)
 "Love in the Time of King Cake", Oldster Magazine, November 15, 2021
 Where to start with Toni Morrison, The Guardian, July 21, 2022

Awards, honors and recognition 

 2022 Black Book Canon https://medium.com/ballasts-for-the-mind/the-100-best-books-by-black-authors-4f91042b8a65 (Sugar, Loving Donovan)
 2022 Born Free: A Renaissance Reading List https://www.nypl.org/blog/2022/08/08/born-free-renaissance-reading-list (Sugar)
 2022 Battle Creek Reads (The Book of Harlan)
 2021: Longreads Best of 2021 (My Seat at the Table)
 2021: Richard and Judy Book Club pick (Sugar)
 2020: Mary Cadden and others, USA Today, "100 Black novelists and fiction writers you should read, from Abi Daré to Zora Neale Hurston"
 2019: Essence Magazine "Best Books of the Decade" (Gathering of Waters)
 2019: Longlist, Women's Prize for Fiction (Praise Song for the Butterflies)
 2019: BCALA Honor Award (Praise Song for the Butterflies)
 2019; Go On Girl Book Club Author of the Year (The Book of Harlan)
 2017: American Book Award (The Book of Harlan)
 2017: Winner 2017 NAACP Image Award for Outstanding Literary Work (The Book of Harlan)
 2016: Washington Post Notable Books of 2016 (The Book of Harlan)
 2016: Historical Novel Society "November Editor’s Choice" (The Book of Harlan)
 2016: National Reading Group Month/ Great Group Reads Selection (The Book of Harlan)
 2016: Award for Excellence in Literature, Art Sanctuary, The Celebration of Black Arts Legacy Awards
 2013: Finalist, Hurston Wright Legacy Award in Fiction (Gathering of Waters)
 2013: National Reading Group Month/Great Group Reads Selection (Nowhere is a Place)
 2012: The New York Times 100 Notable Books (Gathering of Waters)
 2012: Washington Post 50 Best Books (Gathering of Waters)
 2012: The New York Times "Editor’s Choice" (Gathering of Waters) February 17, 2012
 2011: Finalist, Hurston Wright Legacy Award in Fiction (Glorious)
 2011: Black Caucus of the American Library Association, Fiction Award (Glorious)
 2011: Nominated for the 2011 NAACP Image Award for Outstanding Literary Work (Glorious)
 2010: New York Times Book Review (Glorious)
 2010: Debut Selection for The One Book, One Harlem Program (Glorious)
 2010: O Magazine "Book to Watch" (Glorious)
 2010: Historical Novel Society "Editor’s Choice" (Glorious)
 2007: Short-listed for the Hurston Wright Legacy Award in Fiction (Nowhere is a Place)
 2007: National Book Club Conference BeBe Moore Campbell Memorial Literary Award
 2006: Washington PostBest Fiction (Nowhere is a Place)
 2004: Subject of The Lifetime Television 20th Anniversary Commercial
 2004: Black Caucus of the American Library Association, Fiction Honor Award (Loving, Donovan)
 2002: Shortlisted for the Hurston Wright Legacy Award in Fiction (The Warmest December)
 2002: Zora Neale Hurston Society Award for Creative Contribution to Literature
 2001: Black Caucus of the American Library Association, Fiction Honor Award (Sugar)
 2001: Black Writer's Alliance, Gold Pen Award, Best Mainstream Fiction (Sugar)
 2001: Black Writer's Alliance, Gold Pen Award, Best New Author
 2001: Go On Girl Book Club New Author of the Year Award (Sugar)
 2000: New York Times Book Review (Sugar)
 2000: Barnes & Noble Discover Great New Writers (Sugar)

References

External links 

Bernice L. McFadden website
"Conversation with Bernice McFadden and Terry McMillan", BRIC.

21st-century American novelists
African-American novelists
Living people
1966 births
Writers from Brooklyn
Marymount College, Tarrytown alumni
Fordham University alumni
American women novelists
21st-century American women writers
American Book Award winners
Novelists from New York (state)
Tulane University faculty
American women academics
21st-century African-American women writers
21st-century African-American writers
20th-century African-American people
20th-century African-American women